Aramon is a commune in the Gard department in southern France near of Avignon.

Population

Personalities
It was the birthplace of Henri Pitot (1695–1771), hydraulic engineer and the inventor of the Pitot tube.

Economy
At Aramon, there is a thermal power station consisting of 2 units a 700 MW. The chimney of the facility is 252 metres high, the highest in Europe.

See also
Communes of the Gard department

References

Communes of Gard